George Edward Pelham Box  (18 October 1919 – 28 March 2013) was a British statistician, who worked in the areas of quality control, time-series analysis, design of experiments, and Bayesian inference.  He has been called "one of the great statistical minds of the 20th century".

Education and early life
He was born in Gravesend, Kent, England. Upon entering university he began to study chemistry, but was called up for service before finishing. During World War II, he performed experiments for the British Army exposing small animals to poison gas. To analyze the results of his experiments, he taught himself statistics from available texts. After the war, he enrolled at University College London and obtained a bachelor's degree in mathematics and statistics. He received a PhD from the University of London in 1953, under the supervision of Egon Pearson.

Career and research
From 1948 to 1956, Box worked as a statistician for Imperial Chemical Industries (ICI). While at ICI, he took a leave of absence for a year and served as a visiting professor at North Carolina State University at Raleigh. He later went to Princeton University where he served as Director of the Statistical Research Group.

In 1960, Box moved to the University of Wisconsin–Madison to create the Department of Statistics.In 1980, he was named Vilas Research Professor of Statistics, which is the highest honor given to a member of the University of Wisconsin-Madison faculty. Box and Bill Hunter co-founded the Center for Quality and Productivity Improvement at the University of Wisconsin–Madison in 1984. Box officially retired in 1992, becoming an emeritus professor.

Box published books including Statistics for Experimenters (2nd ed., 2005), Time Series Analysis: Forecasting and Control (4th ed., 2008, with Gwilym Jenkins and Gregory C. Reinsel) and Bayesian Inference in Statistical Analysis. (1973, with George Tiao).

Awards and honours
Box served as president of the American Statistical Association in 1978 and of the Institute of Mathematical Statistics in 1979. He received the Shewhart Medal from the American Society for Quality Control in 1968, the Wilks Memorial Award from the American Statistical Association in 1972, the R. A. Fisher Lectureship in 1974, and the Guy Medal in Gold from the Royal Statistical Society in 1993. Box was elected a member of the American Academy of Arts and Sciences in 1974 and a Fellow of the Royal Society (FRS) in 1985.

His name is associated with results in statistics such as Box–Jenkins models, Box–Cox transformations, Box–Behnken designs, and others. Additionally, Box famously wrote, in various books and papers, that "all models are wrong, but some are useful".

Personal life
Box married Jessie Ward in 1945.  In 1959, Box married Joan Fisher, the second of Ronald Fisher's five daughters. In 1978, Joan Fisher Box published a biography of Ronald Fisher, with substantial collaboration with Box. 
Box married Claire Louise Quist in 1985.

Box died on 28 March 2013.  He was 93 years old.

Selected publications
 Box, G.E.P, Cox, D.R. (1964) "An Analysis of Transformations". Journal of the Royal Statistical Society. 26 (2): 211–252.

References

External links

 Box-Behnken designs from a handbook on engineering statistics at NIST
ASQ: George E.P. Box Accomplishments in statistics
 Articles and Reports by George Box
 Statistics for Experimenters - Second Edition, 2005 by George Box, William G. Hunter and Stuart Hunter
 Biography of George E. P. Box from the Institute for Operations Research and the Management Sciences
 

1919 births
People from Gravesend, Kent
Alumni of University College London
Imperial Chemical Industries people
British Army personnel of World War II
English statisticians
American statisticians
Bayesian statisticians
Fellows of the Royal Society
Presidents of the American Statistical Association
Presidents of the Institute of Mathematical Statistics
University of Wisconsin–Madison faculty
Fellows of the American Statistical Association
Probability theorists
2013 deaths
Mathematical statisticians